Daniel Mendes Ribeiro (born 25 May 1988 in Sal), known simply as Dany, is a Cape Verdean footballer who plays as a forward.

External links

1988 births
Living people
People from Sal, Cape Verde
Cape Verdean footballers
Association football forwards
Liga Portugal 2 players
Segunda Divisão players
S.C. Freamunde players
Gil Vicente F.C. players
Sertanense F.C. players
Liga I players
4 de Abril F.C. do Cuando Cubango players
ACF Gloria Bistrița players
C.R.D. Libolo players
G.D. Interclube players
Progresso Associação do Sambizanga players
G.D. Vitória de Sernache players
Cape Verdean expatriate footballers
Cape Verdean expatriate sportspeople in Portugal
Cape Verdean expatriate sportspeople in Romania
Cape Verdean expatriate sportspeople in Angola
Expatriate footballers in Portugal
Expatriate footballers in Romania
Expatriate footballers in Angola